Eduard Ratnikov (born 13 September 1983 in Pärnu) is a retired Estonian football player. He has played in Romanian Liga I club Oţelul Galaţi where his contract with the Romanian Liga I club Oțelul Galați was terminated after just a few appearances for the club.

He than had a brief spell in Kazakhstan, before returning to his former club FC Levadia Tallinn. After leaving Levadia Tallinn, Ratnikov played for Esiliiga club SK Kiviõli Tamme Auto, before returning to the Meistriliiga halfway through the 2012 Season after signing with his father's side JK Tallinna Kalev.

Prior to his move to Romania, Ratnikov had spells at Estonian Meistriliiga clubs Maag Tammeka Tartu, Levadia Tallinn and Bulgarian team Beroe Stara Zagora.

Personal life
His father Sergei is a former international player for Estonia, while his brother Daniil also plays as a professional footballer.

References

External links
 
 Profile on Soccernet.ee 
 Bulgarian Professional Football League 04/05 stats 
 Bulgarian Professional Football League 05/06 stats 

1983 births
Living people
Sportspeople from Pärnu
Estonian footballers
FCI Levadia Tallinn players
PFC Beroe Stara Zagora players
Estonian people of Russian descent
Tartu JK Tammeka players
FC Irtysh Pavlodar players
FC TVMK players
JK Narva Trans players
JK Tallinna Kalev players
ASC Oțelul Galați players
Estonian expatriate footballers
Expatriate footballers in Bulgaria
Estonian expatriate sportspeople in Bulgaria
First Professional Football League (Bulgaria) players
Expatriate footballers in Kazakhstan
Estonian expatriate sportspeople in Kazakhstan
Expatriate footballers in Romania
Estonian expatriate sportspeople in Romania
Liga I players
FC Kiviõli Irbis players
FC Puuma Tallinn players
Association football midfielders
Meistriliiga players